Lock 'n' Load were a Dutch dance duo consisting of Frank van Rooijen and Niels Pijpers. Andre Frauenstein joined the duo in July 2011. They're best known for their 1999 debut single "Blow Ya Mind". "Blow Ya Mind" was remixed and re-released in 2011.

Discography

Charting singles

References

Musical groups established in 1999
1999 establishments in the Netherlands
Dutch dance music groups
English-language singers from the Netherlands